Chikondi Gondwe (born 19 September 1998) is a Malawian footballer who plays as a midfielder for CY Sisters and the Malawi women's national team.

Club career
Gondwe has played for CY Sisters in Malawi.

International career
Gondwe capped for Malawi at senior level during two COSAFA Women's Championship editions (2020 and 2021).

References

External links

1998 births
Living people
People from Mzimba District
Malawian women's footballers
Women's association football midfielders
Malawi women's international footballers